Who Killed Idol? (stylized 'WHO KiLLED IDOL?') is the third studio album by Japanese idol group BiS, released on March 5, 2014. It is the last studio album released by the group before they disbanded in July 2014, and the only studio album to feature members First Summer Uika, Tentenko, Saki Kamiya and Megumi Koshouji. The album was released following a period of multiple changes in the BiS lineup, resulting in some tracks featuring members that were no longer part of the group by the time the album was released. The album continues the basic style of their previous albums, but shows more variety in the various styles of rock and pop featured in the tracks: "STUPiG" showcases a digital hardcore sound, "Hi" takes a step into upbeat punk rock, and "MURA-MURA" ventures into SKA-core. The pattern of including a cover track is continued, with "Primal" by The Yellow Monkey being included as the final track. The original version of this track also happened to be the last song The Yellow Monkey released before they disbanded, adding to its significance in the album.

Guests 
The album features many famous Japanese rock musicians, either performing on the songs or providing music for songs. "STUPiG" is written and arranged by Takeshi Ueda of AA= and The Mad Capsule Markets; "Hi" is written by Akihiro Namba of Hi-Standard; "MURA-MURA" is written and arranged by Noriaki Tsuda of Kemuri, who also plays bass on the track as well; "BiSimulation" is written by Toru Hidaka of Beat Crusaders; The guitar solo of "primal.2" is performed by Hisashi of GLAY, who is also a fan of BiS. "GET YOU" is a collaboration track with fellow Avex idols Dorothy Little Happy and is taken from the collaboration single of the same name.

Track listing

Personnel

Notes
All writing, arrangement and personnel credits taken from the album insert.

References

2014 albums
Bis (Japanese idol group) albums